The Egg River is a  tributary of the Otter Tail River of Minnesota in the United States.  It flows through a chain of lakes in the Tamarac National Wildlife Refuge and the White Earth Indian Reservation in Becker County, Minnesota.

Egg River, as well as the Egg Lakes through which it flows, is an English translation of the original Ojibway word for the stream and proximate habitat, once characterized as a nesting area for water-loving birds.

See also
List of rivers of Minnesota

References

Minnesota Watersheds
USGS Hydrologic Unit Map - State of Minnesota (1974)

Rivers of Minnesota
Rivers of Becker County, Minnesota